is a Japanese slice of life historical seinen manga series written and illustrated by Natsume Ono. It was published in Shogakukan's Monthly Ikki  from May 2011 to September 2014, when the magazine ceased publication. It was then serialization in Hibana from March 2015 to September 2016. Its chapters were published by Shogakukan in seven tankōbon volumes.

A 5-episode Japanese television drama adaptation was broadcast from June to July 2015. 5-episode second season was broadcast from September to October 2016.

Characters
Benzō (Ken'ichi Matsuyama)
Sōji (Taichi Saotome)
Okon (Nanao)

Media

Manga
Futagashira is written and illustrated by Natsume Ono. The series began in the July 2011 issue of Shogakukan's Monthly Ikki, released on May 25, 2011. Monthly Ikki ceased publication on September 25, 2014, and the series was transferred to the then new brand magazine Hibana, starting on March 6, 2015. The manga finished in the September 2016 issue of Hibana, released on August 6, 2016. Shogakukan compiled its chapters into seven tankōbon volumes, released from December 27, 2011, to September 12, 2016.

Volume list

Drama
A 5-episode Japanese television drama adaptation was broadcast on WOWOW from June 13 to July 11, 2015. A 5-episode second season was broadcast from September 11 to October 15, 2016. The soundtrack was composed and performed by Japanese "Death Jazz" band Soil & "Pimp" Sessions.

References

External links
Official manga website 
Official TV drama website 

Historical anime and manga
Seinen manga
Shogakukan franchises
Shogakukan manga
Slice of life anime and manga
Wowow original programming